Henri Weigelt (born 17 January 1998) is a German professional footballer who plays as a centre-back for TSV Steinbach Haiger.

Career
Weigeilt made one appearance for Eredivisie club AZ in a cup match against Alcides. He was released on 30 June 2020.

References

External links
 

1998 births
Living people
Sportspeople from Bielefeld
German footballers
Footballers from North Rhine-Westphalia
Association football defenders
2. Bundesliga players
Regionalliga players
Eredivisie players
Arminia Bielefeld players
AZ Alkmaar players
Borussia Dortmund II players
TSV Steinbach Haiger players
German expatriate footballers
German expatriate sportspeople in the Netherlands
Expatriate footballers in the Netherlands